The 1922 George Washington Hatchetites Colonials football team was an American football team that represented George Washington University as an independent during the 1922 college football season. In their second season under head coach William Quigley, the team compiled a 2–6 record.

Schedule

References

George Washington
George Washington Colonials football seasons
George Washington Hatchetites football